The 2022 Northern State Wolves football team represented Northern State University as a member North Division of the Northern Sun Intercollegiate Conference (NSIC) during the 2022 NCAA Division II football season. The Wolves were led by second-year head coach Mike Schmidt.

The Wolves finished the season at 6–5 (6–5 NSIC)

Previous Season
In 2021, the Wolves finished 7–4 (7–4 NSIC) and finished tied for fifth in the NSIC. The 2021 season was also the inaugural season for Dacotah Bank Stadium, the new home field for the Wolves.

Schedule

References

Northern State
Northern State Wolves football seasons
Northern State Wolves football